Slalom Lake is a small lake  north of Ardley Cove, Fildes Peninsula, King George Island. Located near the Soviet Antarctic Expedition Bellingshausen Station, erected 1968, the lake was named "Ozero Slalomnoye" (slalom lake). The translated form has been approved.

Lakes of Antarctica